Louis Smith (9 March 1928 – 21 October 2007) was a country and western singer who recorded for Top Talent Records at one time, and reportedly had gotten his start into music when the nephew of Tex Ritter, Ken Ritter, heard him perform at a local honky tonk.

Lou played many of the local Southeast Texas clubs and honky tonks.  At one point country legend George Jones sang backup for Lou during Jones' early teens when he was just beginning his career.  His notable songs include "My Name is Lou", "I'll Be the One", "Born to Be Lonely", "Always a Winner", and "Close to My Heart".

Singles

References

1928 births
2007 deaths
People from Joaquin, Texas
American country singer-songwriters
20th-century American singers
Singer-songwriters from Texas
Country musicians from Texas